Kwok Tsz Kaai (born 26 December 1996) is a Hong Kong professional footballer who plays as a midfielder for Hong Kong Premier League club HK U23.

References

External links

Kwok Tsz Kaai at HKFA

1996 births
Living people
Hong Kong footballers
Association football midfielders
Hong Kong Rangers FC players
Dreams Sports Club players
Yuen Long FC players
TSW Pegasus FC players
HK U23 Football Team players
Hong Kong Premier League players